The 2012 NC State Wolfpack football team represented North Carolina State University in the 2012 NCAA Division I FBS football season. The Wolfpack were led by sixth year head coach Tom O'Brien and played their home games at Carter–Finley Stadium. They were members of the Atlantic Division of the Atlantic Coast Conference. The Wolfpack participated in the Music City Bowl and were defeated by Vanderbilt, 38–24.

On November 25, the university announced that it had fired O'Brien as head coach of the Wolfpack after failing to live up the expectations during his six years at the position.

Schedule

Personnel

Season summary

Miami (FL)

Clemson

References

NC State
NC State Wolfpack football seasons
NC State Wolfpack football